The COVID-19 pandemic in Malawi is part of the worldwide pandemic of coronavirus disease 2019 caused by severe acute respiratory syndrome coronavirus 2. The virus was confirmed to have reached Malawi on 2 April 2020. It has spread to all districts of Malawi.

Background 
On 12 January 2020, the World Health Organization (WHO) confirmed that a novel coronavirus was the cause of a respiratory illness in a cluster of people in Wuhan City, Hubei Province, China, which was reported to the WHO on 31 December 2019.

The case fatality ratio for COVID-19 has been much lower than SARS of 2003, but the transmission has been significantly greater, with a significant total death toll. Model-based simulations for Malawi indicate that the 95% confidence interval for the time-varying reproduction number R t was stable below 1.0 from July to September 2020 but exceeded 1.0 the last three months of 2020.

Timeline

April to June 2020
 President Peter Mutharika confirmed the country's first three cases of coronavirus disease 2019 on 2 April. The three cases include a Malawian of Asian origin who travelled back from India, her relative and their housemaid.
 A fourth case was confirmed on 4 April which involved an individual who had recently returned from the UK. A fifth case involved a woman who had returned from the UK and had quarantined some weeks earlier. On 7 April, it was announced that she had passed on. Malawi has identified three more cases, making a total of 8. One is of a 34-year-old who had immediate contact with the first case that was registered on 2 April, the second involved a 28-year-old lady who traveled from the UK on 19 March, whereas the third case was of a 30-year-old gentleman who traveled to South Africa on 16 March.
 During the month there were 37 confirmed cases, three deaths and 7 recoveries, leaving 27 active cases at the end of the month.
 In May there were 247 new cases, bringing the total number of confirmed cases to 284. One patient died, raising the death toll to four. The number of recovered patients rose by 35 to 42, leaving 238 active cases at the end of the month.
 In June there were 940 new cases, bringing the total number of confirmed cases to 1224. The death toll rose to 14. The number of recovered patients increased by 218 to 260, leaving 950 active cases at the end of the month.

July to September 2020
 There were 2854 new cases in July, raising the total number of confirmed cases to 4078. The death toll rose by 100 to 114. The number of recovered patients increased by 1615 to 1875, leaving 2089 active cases by the end of the month (up by 120% from the end of June).
 On 8 August, the recovery rate exceeded 50% for the first time. There were 1488 new cases in August, raising the total number of confirmed cases to 5566. The death toll rose to 175. At the end of the month there were 2231 active cases.
 There were 206 new cases in September, bringing the total number of confirmed cases to 5772. The death toll rose to 179. The number of recovered patients increased to 4245, leaving 1348 active cases at the end of the month.

October to December 2020
 There were 158 new cases in October, bringing the total number of confirmed cases to 5930. The death toll rose to 184. The number of recovered patients increased to 5323, leaving 423 active cases at the end of the month.
 A large increase in the suicide rate (as much as 57% according to Malawi police) has been attributed to the economic downturn caused by the pandemic.
 There were 98 new cases in November, bringing the total number of confirmed cases to 6028. The death toll rose to 185. The number of recovered patients increased to 5455, leaving 388 active cases at the end of the month.
 There were 555 new cases in December, taking the total number of confirmed cases to 6583. The death toll rose to 189. The number of recovered patients increased to 5705, leaving 689 active cases at the end of the month.
 Among those who died from COVID-19 was Tarcisius Gervazio Ziyaye, 71, archbishop of Roman Catholic Archdiocese of Lilongwe (since 2001).

January to March 2021
 The country went into lockdown on 18 January, the first time since the pandemic began. By then Malawi had recorded 12,470 coronavirus cases and 314 deaths, with a 40% increase in infections in a month.
 There were 17380 new cases in January, raising the total number of confirmed cases to 23963. The death toll rose to 702. The number of recovered patients increased to 8615, leaving 14646 active cases at the end of the month. Among the fatalities were two Cabinet ministers, Lingson Belekanyama and Sidik Mia, both of whom died from Covid-related complications on 12 January.
 There were 7982 new cases in February, raising the total number of confirmed cases to 31945. The death toll rose to 1044. The number of recovered patients increased to 18874, leaving 12027 active cases at the end of the month.
 Mass vaccination started on 11 March, initially with 360,000 doses of AstraZeneca's Covishield vaccine.
 There were 1606 new cases in March, raising the total number of confirmed cases to 33551. The death toll rose to 1117. The number of recovered patients increased to 30272, leaving 2028 active cases at the end of the month. 134,289 persons were vaccinated in March.

April to June 2021
 The Ministry of Health announced on 14 April that more than 16,000 doses of the Covishield vaccine would be destroyed as they were about to expire.
 There were 527 new cases in April, raising the total number of confirmed cases to 34078. The death toll rose to 1148. The number of recovered patients increased to 32051, leaving 879 active cases at the end of the month. 161,828 persons were vaccinated in April, taking the overall number of inoculations to 296,127.
 There were 260 new cases in May, raising the total number of confirmed cases to 34338. The death toll rose to 1155. The number of recovered patients increased to 32616, leaving 335 active cases at the end of the month. 58,991 persons were vaccinated in May, taking the overall number of inoculations to 355,118.
 There were 1788 new cases in June, raising the total number of confirmed cases to 36126. The death toll rose to 1196. The number of recovered patients increased to 33169, leaving 1761 active cases at the end of the month.

July to September 2021
 There were 16221 new cases in July, raising the total number of confirmed cases to 52347. The death toll rose to 1635. The number of recovered patients increased to 38005, leaving 12475 active cases at the end of the month. The number of fully vaccinated persons stood at 138,154.
 There were 8147 new cases in August, raising the total number of confirmed cases to 60494. The death toll rose to 2177. The number of recovered patients increased to 49105, leaving 10212 active cases at the end of the month. The number of fully vaccinated persons stood at 210,692.
 There were 1086 new cases in September, raising the total number of confirmed cases to 61580. The death toll rose to 2282. The number of recovered patients increased to 55337, leaving 3961 active cases at the end of the month. The number of fully vaccinated persons more than doubled to 496,875.

October to December 2021
 There were 216 new cases in October, bringing the total number of confirmed cases to 61796. The death toll rose to 2301. The number of recovered patients increased to 57313, leaving 2182 active cases at the end of the month.
 There were 120 new cases in November, bringing the total number of confirmed cases to 61916. The death toll rose to 2306. The number of recovered patients increased to 58807, leaving 803 active cases at the end of the month.
 Malawi's first three cases of the Omicron variant were reported on 9 December.
 There were 13159 new cases in December, bringing the total number of confirmed cases to 75075. The death toll rose to 2364. The number of recovered patients increased to 60145, leaving 12334 active cases at the end of the month. Modelling by WHO's Regional Office for Africa suggests that due to under-reporting, the true cumulative number of infections by the end of 2021 was around 8.6 million while the true number of COVID-19 deaths was around 10493.

January to March 2022
 There were 9400 new cases in January, bringing the total number of confirmed cases to 84475. The death toll rose to 2561. The number of recovered patients increased to 69332, leaving 12350 active cases at the end of the month.
 There were 853 new cases in February, bringing the total number of confirmed cases to 85328. The death toll rose to 2615. The number of recovered patients increased to 75578, leaving 7135 active cases at the end of the month.
 There were 312 new cases in March, bringing the total number of confirmed cases to 85640. The death toll rose to 2626. The number of recovered patients increased to 80330, leaving 2684 active cases at the end of the month.

April to June 2022
 There were 148 new cases in April, bringing the total number of confirmed cases to 85788. The death toll rose to 2634. The number of recovered patients increased to 82066, leaving 1081 active cases at the end of the month.
 There were 185 new cases in May, bringing the total number of confirmed cases to 85973. The death toll rose to 2640. The number of recovered patients increased to 82860, leaving 473 active cases at the end of the month.
 There were 533 new cases in June, bringing the total number of confirmed cases to 86506. The death toll rose to 2645.

July to September 2022
 There were 904 new cases in July, bringing the total number of confirmed cases to 87410. The death toll rose to 2665. The number of recovered patients increased to 83869, leaving 876 active cases at the end of the month.
 There were 491 new cases in August, bringing the total number of confirmed cases to 87901. The death toll rose to 2678.
 There were 128 new cases in September, bringing the total number of confirmed cases to 88029. The death toll rose to 2682.

October to December 2022
 In October the total number of confirmed cases was revised down to 87999 (due to "an ongoing alignment exercise"). The death toll rose to 2683.
 In November the total number of confirmed cases increased to 88079. The death toll rose to 2685.
 In December the total number of confirmed cases increased to 88164. The death toll remained unchanged.

January to December 2023
 In January the total number of confirmed cases increased to 88559. The death toll rose to 2686.
 In February the total number of confirmed cases increased to 88702. The death toll remained unchanged.

Statistics

Confirmed new cases per day

Confirmed deaths per day

Government response
Despite there being no confirmed cases prior to 2 April 2020, President Mutharika declared the coronavirus pandemic a national disaster. Some of the measures that were put in place included the banning of gatherings of more than 100 people in places such as churches, rallies, weddings and funerals. He also instructed that both public and private education institutions be closed from 23 March. He further urged the government to suspend the hosting of international meetings and banned public servants from attending regional and international meetings. He called upon returning residents and nationals coming from affected countries to subject themselves to either self- or institutional quarantine.

It was only after the first four cases were identified in April that Mutharika instituted new measures which included the suspension of all formal meetings, gatherings and conferences. He further directed the Malawi Prison Services and Juvenile Centres to present a list of prisoners and juveniles who committed "petty offences" including those that have served a significant portion of their sentences for moderate crimes to the Minister of Homeland Security in order to decongest the overpopulation of the country's prisons. Other measures have included the slashing of fuel prices as well as placing a waiver on the non-tourist levy to support the tourism industry, including a waiver of the resident tax on all foreign doctors and medical personnel. The Treasury has been called upon to reduce the salaries of the President, Cabinet and deputy ministers by 10 percent for three months in order to redirect the resources to fight against the coronavirus. The Malawi Revenue Authority was instructed to open up a voluntary tax compliance window for a period of six months so as to allow taxpayers with arrears to settle their tax obligations. Mutharika called upon all offices to work in shifts except those working in essential services in order to mitigate the congestion in the workplaces. On 14 April, President Mutharika announced a 21-day lockdown starting Saturday 18 April at midnight. However, on 17 April, the Malawi High Court temporarily barred the government from implementing the 21-day lockdown following a petition by the Human Rights Defenders Coalition. The argument made by the Human Rights Defenders Coalition was that more consultation was needed to prevent harm to the poorest and most vulnerable of society.

See also
 COVID-19 pandemic in Africa
 COVID-19 pandemic by country and territory

References

 
coronavirus pandemic
coronavirus pandemic
Malawi
Malawi
Disease outbreaks in Malawi